The 1920 Grand National was the 79th renewal of the Grand National horse race that took place at Aintree Racecourse near Liverpool, England, on 26 March 1920.

The race, which was run in heavy rain and attended by King George V, was won by the Irish horse Troytown by twelve lengths. Poethlyn, the winner of the race the two previous years, started as the favourite but fell at the first fence.

Finishing Order

Non-finishers

References

 1920
Grand National
Grand National
20th century in Lancashire